The Romblomanon people are the indigenous inhabitants of Romblon province. They are part of the Visayan metaethnicity.

Area
Romblomanons live mainly in the province of Romblon. However, due to population increase, which the island province's small area couldn't sustain, there are also significant numbers of Romblomanons in Occidental Mindoro, Oriental Mindoro, Masbate, Aklan, Palawan, Capiz, and possible parts of Luzon and Mindanao.

Demographics
Romblomanons number 157,398 in 2010, and are considered as Visayans. Romblomanons speak one of three languages, the Romblomanon language, Asi language, and the Onhan language. Most are Roman Catholics. Due to its distance from Capiz and Aklan, most Romblomanons can speak Hiligaynon.

Culture

History

References

Ethnic groups in Romblon